
The following lists events that happened during 1822 in South Africa.

Events
  The British proclaim St. Lucia a township
 The Dutch language is abolished in the Cape Colony and English becomes the only official language

References
See Years in South Africa for list of references

 
South Africa
Years in South Africa